Cardig Air is a cargo airline with its head office and home base at Jakarta, Indonesia. It operates scheduled all-cargo services across Asia and Indonesia as well as charter services to various domestic and regional destinations.

Cardig Air owns and operates two Boeing 737 Classic aircraft which had been converted to freighters. Up until 2018 Cardig Air operated scheduled international flights connecting Jakarta, Ho Chi Minh City, and Shenzhen, as well as scheduled domestic flights connecting Jayapura and Wamena. In 2020, following takeover by a new group of investors spearheaded by Mr. Dian Nasution, the airline aims to focus primarily on domestic routes.

History
Cardig Air was established in April 2004. In July 2008, a group of investors injected new capital and acquired majority stake in Cardig Air from PT Cardig International. The new management replaced the company's Boeing 737-200Cs with higher-capacity and more fuel-efficient Boeing 737-300Fs.

In 2008, Cardig Air leased its first two 737-300Fs, which arrived in Jakarta that October; and full operations started in January 2009, serving customers on both a scheduled and charter basis. In 2012, Cardig Air added another Boeing 737-300F to its fleet.

In 2016, Cardig Air launched a China – Vietnam - Indonesia route and became the first Indonesian cargo airline that operates scheduled flights between the three countries.

In 2019, the airline was purchased by a new group of investors and the restructuring of the company is currently underway to refocus on domestic routes.

In 2020, the airline received two Boeing 737 Classic Freighters to serve domestic cargo routes.

Destinations
Cardig Air operates scheduled and charter freighter services, providing transportation linkages in Indonesia. Scheduled destinations include:

Indonesia
Banjarmasin - Banjarmasin (BDJ)
Balikpapan - Balikpapan (BPN)
Gorontalo -  Gorontalo (GTO)
Jakarta - Jakarta (CGK)
Kendari -  Kendari (KDI)
Makassar - Makassar (UPG)
Manado - Manado (MDC)
Pekanbaru - Pekanbaru (PKU)
Tarakan - Tarakan (TRK)

Fleet

Current fleet

The Cardig Air fleet consists of the following aircraft (as of March 2022):

Former fleet
The airline previously operated the following aircraft (as of March 2022):
 2 Boeing 737-200F
 4 Boeing 737-300F
 2 Boeing 737-400F

References

External links

Official website
https://www.youtube.com/watch?v=c4aeL4jK0qU 

Airlines of Indonesia
Cargo airlines of Indonesia
Indonesian companies established in 2004
Airlines established in 2004